Baxter  may refer to:

Arts and entertainment

Fictional entities
 Baxter Building, in the Marvel Comics universe
 Baxter Stockman, in Teenage Mutant Ninja Turtles
 Baxter, a character in the animated web series Hazbin Hotel
 Mr Baxter, a character in The Adventures of Tintin

Film and television
 Baxter!, a 1973 British film starring Britt Ekland
 Baxter (film), a 1989 French horror film featuring a thinking dog named "Baxter"
 The Baxter, a 2005 romantic comedy
 The Baxters, a TV sitcom 1979–1981
 Baxter (TV series), 2010–2011
 The Baxters (2019 TV series)

Music
 Baxter (electronica band), a Swedish electronica band
Baxter (1998 album)
 Baxter (punk band), an American post-hardcore band, and the name of their first album
 Baxter, a 2000 album in which various New Zealand musicians set 12 of James K. Baxter's poems to music

Businesses and organizations
 Baxters, a British food processing company 
 Baxter Aviation, former Canadian airline 
 Baxter's Bus Lines, an Australian bus company
 Baxter College, a secondary school in Kidderminster, United Kingdom
 Baxter International, an American healthcare company 
 Baxter Theatre Centre, Rondebosch, South Africa
 Philip Baxter College, University of New South Wales, Australia

People
Baxter (name), including a list of people with the name

Places

Antarctica 
Mount Baxter (Antarctica)

Australia 
Baxter, Victoria
 Baxter railway station
 Baxter Immigration Reception and Processing Centre, near Port Augusta, South Australia
 Baxter protests of 2003 and 2005 
 Baxter Field, baseball stadium in Lismore, New South Wales, Australia

Canada 
Baxter, Ontario
Baxter Lakes, in Alberta

United States 
Baxter, Arkansas
Baxter County, Arkansas
Baxter, California
Baxter, Colorado
Baxter, Georgia
Baxter, Iowa
Baxter, Kentucky
Baxter, Michigan
Baxter, Minnesota
Baxter, Missouri
Baxter, Pennsylvania
Baxter Village, South Carolina
Baxter, Tennessee
Baxter, Texas
Baxter, Wisconsin
Baxter, Berkeley County, West Virginia
Baxter, Marion County, West Virginia
 Baxter Arena, in the campus of the University of Nebraska, Omaha, U.S.
Baxter Boulevard, Portland, Maine
 Baxter Building (Portland, Maine), U.S.
Baxter Creek, a stream in California
Baxter Estates, New York
Baxter Lake (New Hampshire)
Baxter Mill, West Yarmouth, Massachusetts
Baxter Springs, Kansas
Baxter State Park, Maine
Baxter Street Historic District, Quincy, Massachusetts
Baxter Township, Lac qui Parle County, Minnesota
Baxter Woods, nature reserve in Portland, Maine
Mount Baxter (California)

Other uses 
 Baxter LePage, former first dog of Maine, U.S.
 Baxter, a 1916 Meteorite fall
 Baxter (robot), an industrial robot

See also

Baxter House (disambiguation)
 Justice Baxter (disambiguation)
Baxter v. United States, 1986 federal tax case
 Baxter permutation, a combinatorial object
 Baxter's law, a law of economics
 Baxter, Vera Baxter, a 1977 French film